Another Side is an album released on 12 November 2007 by John Barrowman under the Sony BMG label. The album is composed entirely of chosen cover songs. Speaking of his decision to release his solo album, Barrowman stated that it wasn't about launching a pop career, but about giving people a chance to see "Another Side" to him as an entertainer. The album reached number 22 on the UK Album Charts and was certified gold on 11 January 2008; Barrowman was subsequently presented with a 'Gold Disc' to acknowledge this on The Alan Titchmarsh Show in February of that year.

Track listing

References

2007 albums
Covers albums